Portsburgh was a burgh of barony outside the city walls of Edinburgh, Scotland from 1649 to 1856, taking its name from the West Port (gate) of Edinburgh.  It extended from Lochrin in the west to Drummond Street in the east, and from King's Stables Road in the north to the Meadows in the south. The name survives in Portsburgh Square off the West Port, which was itself formerly named Wester Portsburgh.

References

Areas of Edinburgh
Burghs
1649 establishments in Scotland